Ann McKim was one of the first true clipper ships. The opening of new Treaty ports in the East in the early 1840s eased an access of the US merchants to China, which demanded the ships that could move cargo faster than then-traditional slow-moving, high-capacity merchant ships. The Ann McKim was one of the ships that had answered the demand in the early years and sailed between New York and China in 1840–1842, until newer and faster cargo-carriers, such as the nearly 600-ton clipper Houqua, the 598-ton China packet Helena, Witch of the Wave, and Rainbow, with the last two built expressly to outperform the Ann McKim started dominating the shipping world of the US-China trade and the Ann McKim was shifted back to the South American trade routes.

History
Ann McKim was built in Baltimore, Maryland, United States, by James Williamson in partnership with Samuel Kennard on a commission of "the wealthy sea-dog and merchant," Honorable Issac McKim and named after his wife, Ann.

Kennard & Williamson partnership
The Kennard & Williamson partnership was a shipbuilding firm in Fell's point, Baltimore in 1830s. The partnership began 15 June 1831. It was formed between James Joseph Williamson and Samuel Kennard (also known as Kinard and Kinnard). Williamson used to work for Kennard as a carpenter prior to the forming of the partnership. Kennard built at least five vessels before their partnership: the sloop Dolphin (95 tons), the sloop Edward (36 tons) in 1815; the brig Cervantes (231 tons) in 1818; the brig Montezuma (223 tons) in 1825; and the brig James Ramsey (134 tons) in 1830.
Their partnership built only two vessels, the schooner Pennsylvania, which brought in a $1,500 profit, and Ann McKim. Kennard & Williamson also grossed a lot of profit from repair work. The partnership was dissolved on 26 September 1834.
After the partnership's demise, Kennard built one more vessel in 1835, the schooner Gunpowder, 75 tons. Williamson, as a partner at Williamson & Richardson, in 1837 built the ferry Susquehanna, 453 tons (cost $56,595.81) and another fourteen vessels: a barque, two brigs and eleven schooners. Williamson died in 1839.

McKim's pet ship
Ann McKim was designed to have a small cargo capacity that made her much faster that the regular cargo ships of her time. Her launch was attended by thousands of spectators as she was hailed by a local newspaper as "the most masterly and beautiful specimen of the naval architecture" of the shipyards of Baltimore, if not any other city in the union. Although, she was a matter of pride and admiration for the public and surely for her owner, she had never brought significant profit to Mr. Isaac McKim due to her small cargo capacity. She was more of a pet-ship for a wealthy merchant than anything else.

In the Canton trade
In 1838, after the death of Isaac McKim and five years in the China trade she was sold to Howland & Aspinwall, New York, the company known for owning other famous clippers, such as Rainbow and Sea Witch. Under new owner she was commanded by Captain Perry and was put into the Canton trade. The ship was heavily used and brought some profit to the owners as she was superior in speed over the other vessels engaged in that line of trade at that time.

Under the Chilean flag
The Ann McKim was sold to Valparaiso, Chile in 1847 and sailed under the Chilean flag for five years between Valparaiso and San Francisco. Although, there are some accounts that she sailed as an Ecuadorean under Captain Van Pelt, before being registered as a Chilean vessel in December 1849. She was advertised for sale in Daily Alta California from January to August 1850, but evidently couldn't find a buyer and on 2 September 1851 she cleared Port of San Francisco, leaving the North American waters for the very last time with Van Pelt as her captain and Orrego Bros. as owners. She was mentioned once again for sale in the issue of Daily Alta California dated 18 February 1852 and later that year the Baltimore legend was dismantled at Valparaiso.

Other ships of the same name
In 1847, there was mention of a steamer of New Orleans of the same name participating in the Mexican–American War.

Design

Ann McKim was a Baltimore clipper, measuring 143 feet in length, making her "easily the largest merchantman of her day...and...by far the handsomest." William M. Williamson, a notable authority on sailing ships at the time, described her as "a thing of beauty." She had three sail yards and royal stunsails. Her square raking stern and the heavy after-drag were the common features of Baltimore clippers then. She was also distinguished by her long, easy waterlines with low freeboard and a V-shaped hull. Her length-to-width ratio of over 5:1 corresponded to an extreme clipper. The bow was round in contrast with the sharp bows of the later clippers. Her bow was decorated with a figurehead in a shape of a woman. She had sloping keel—another feature that was not present in true clippers. The frame was made of live oak. The hull was covered with imported red copper, adding $9,000 to her total cost. (The use of copper was probably related to the fact that Isaac McKim Isaac owned a copper rolling and refining mill.) The decks were of teak and her rails, hatch coamings, and skylights were finished with Spanish mahogany. The finest materials used in her construction were personally selected by Captain James Curtis. She also had twelve brass guns mounted on her together with brass capstan heads and bells. The figurehead was design after the wife of the owner, Mrs. Ann McKim.

The total amount paid by Isaac McKim for the Ann McKim was reported as $50,000, which is probably an exaggeration given the compassion with the similar ships built at the time. Kennard & Williamson sent thirty one bill to Isaac McKim, amounting $11,981.66, which could be all related to Ann McKim.

Voyages
She was ready for her maiden voyage on 30 August 1833, under the command of Captain Walker. She brought 3,500 barrels of flour to Callao, Peru on the 3rd of December, after a passage of 95 days. Ann McKim remained on the South American coast for some time, and it was not until April 1834 when she sailed back to Cape Henry in 72 days and was once more lying in the port of Baltimore on 16 June 1834. In 1837 she set one of her records on the South American trade, sailing in just 59 days from Valparaiso to the Virginia Capes of Chesapeake Bay and in 42 days from off Cape Horn to Chesapeake Bay.

In 1838, she made the passage from Coquimbo, Chile to Baltimore in 60 days and in 53 days from Valparaiso to Baltimore, establishing a new record of her career on this route. The same year she sailed under Captain Martin's command to China and back home in 150 days, arriving to New York on 23 November 1840. On her second voyage, she reached China in 92 days and the return trip lasted 88 days. In 1842, she set in a new record of 79 days, sailing from New York via Java Head to Anyer, Indonesia. Her return trip home to New York in 1843 was 96 days. As the faster clippers started dominating the routes to and from China the Ann McKim wasn't able to compete with them and was brought back to South America. She was sold at Valparaiso to a Chilean owners in 1847.

Under the Chilean flag, she arrived to San Francisco on 19 January 1849 from Valparaiso, touching at Guayaquil, Ecuador on the 24th of December 1948. This voyage lasted 51 days (51 days at sea from Valparaiso; 29 days from Guayaquil). Her next voyage from San Francisco to Valparaiso was a chocking one as Captain James Van Pelt did not stock enough water on the ship and ten of her passengers suffered from dehydration upon her arrival to the destination on 10 October 1849.

Legacy
Although Ann McKim was the first large clipper ship ever constructed, it is not to say that she opened the clipper ship era, or even that she directly influenced shipbuilders, since no other ship was built like her. She may have suggested the clipper design in vessels of ship rig. Ann McKim was rather a transitional vessel, which did, however, influence the building of Rainbow in 1845, the first extreme clipper ship. Rainbow design was formulated by John W. Griffiths after he, very impressed with the speed of Ann McKim, studied her blueprints. On the same note: the terms Baltimore clipper and clipper ship should not be confused. The former term is refereed to the clippers with a displacement between 50 and 200 tons built in Chesapeake Bay in the late 18th century and the latter is to the much larger clippers of the 1840s from New York with a displacement often ten times of what was the Baltimore clippers.

She was the first ship named after a woman.

During 1843–1844, the first American woman ever in China traveled on board of Ann McKim. (A year prior an American, Mrs. Noble was taken a prisoner in China.)

In 1986, Ann McKim was induced in the fifth class of seafarers and ships by the National Maritime Hall of Fame at the American Merchant Marine Museum.

Paintings
One of the earliest appearances of Ann McKim in print was a lithograph of master mariner and ship model maker E. Armitage McCann, circa 1920. She later printed on a collection of ceramic serving platters by Wedgwood, Josiah & Sons Inc., circa 1938.

Ann McKim appeared on a few paintings of Montague Dawson. Most notable are The "Ann McKim" leaving Foochow for Home, circa 1960, sold at Christie's for $116,550 in 2013 and White Squall – Clipper Ship "Ann Mckim", sold for $68,500 to a private collector from Virginia in 2014.

She was printed with five sails per mast by Charles J. A. Wilson on Ann McKim of Baltimore – First American Clipper.  Ann McKim was painted by the American painter John W. Schmidt in 1977, showing her at sea in the morning light. Two paintings of her by Danish-American artist Torsten Kruse appeared in a book about Fell's Point.

References

1833 establishments in Maryland
1852 disestablishments in Chile
Baltimore Clipper